This is the results breakdown of the local elections held in the Community of Madrid on 27 May 2007. The following tables show detailed results in the autonomous community's most populous municipalities, sorted alphabetically.

Overall

City control
The following table lists party control in the most populous municipalities, including provincial capitals (shown in bold). Gains for a party are displayed with the cell's background shaded in that party's colour.

Municipalities

Alcalá de Henares
Population: 201,380

Alcobendas
Population: 104,118

Alcorcón
Population: 164,633

Coslada
Population: 83,233

Fuenlabrada
Population: 193,715

Getafe
Population: 156,320

Leganés
Population: 182,471

Madrid

Population: 3,128,600

Móstoles
Population: 206,301

Parla
Population: 95,087

Torrejón de Ardoz
Population: 112,114

See also
2007 Madrilenian regional election

References

Madrid
2007